Michael Vincent Hayden (born March 17, 1945) is a retired United States Air Force four-star general and former Director of the National Security Agency, Principal Deputy Director of National Intelligence, and Director of the Central Intelligence Agency. Hayden currently co-chairs the Bipartisan Policy Center's Electric Grid Cyber Security Initiative. In 2017, Hayden became a national security analyst for CNN.
	
He was Director of the National Security Agency (NSA) from 1999 to 2005. During his tenure as director, he initiated and oversaw the NSA surveillance of technological communications between persons in the United States and foreign citizens who allegedly had ties to terrorist groups, which resulted in the NSA warrantless surveillance controversy. In 2020, a federal court ruled that the NSA program was illegal and possibly unconstitutional.

On April 21, 2005, then Lt. Gen Hayden, was confirmed by the United States Senate as the first Principal Deputy Director of National Intelligence and awarded his fourth star-making him "the highest-ranking military intelligence officer in the armed forces". He served in this position under DNI John Negroponte until May 26, 2006.

On May 8, 2006, Hayden was nominated for the position of Director of the Central Intelligence Agency following the resignation of Porter J. Goss, and on 23 May the United States Senate Select Committee on Intelligence voted 12–3 to send the nomination to the Senate floor. His nomination was confirmed by the United States Senate on 26 May by a vote of 78–15. On May 30, 2006, and again the following day at the CIA lobby with President George W. Bush in attendance, Hayden was sworn in as the director of the Central Intelligence Agency.

On July 1, 2008, Hayden retired from the Air Force after over 41 years of service, while continuing to serve as Director of the CIA until February 12, 2009. He received an honorary doctorate from The Institute of World Politics in Washington, D.C., in 2009.

He served for a number of years as a principal at the Chertoff Group, a security consultancy, but left at the end 2022. He is also a founder of the Michael V. Hayden Center for Intelligence, Policy, and International Security at the Schar School of Policy and Government at George Mason University. Hayden is currently on the advisory board of NewsGuard.

Early life and education
Michael Vincent Hayden was born on March 17, 1945, in Pittsburgh, Pennsylvania, to an Irish-American couple, Sadie (Murray) and Harry V. Hayden Jr., who worked as a welder for a Pennsylvania manufacturing company. He has a sister, Debby, and a brother, Harry.

Hayden attended St. Peter's Elementary School where, in 7th and 8th grade he played quarterback on the school football team then being coached by the late Dan Rooney, the son of the founder of the Pittsburgh Steelers, and former chairman of the team. Hayden graduated from North Catholic High School. One of his first jobs was as an equipment manager for the Steelers. He went on to Duquesne University in Pittsburgh, where he earned a Bachelor of Arts in history in 1967 and was commissioned as a second lieutenant. He then attended graduate school at Duquesne for a master's degree in modern American history. He continues to be an avid fan of the hometown Pittsburgh Steelers, since the 1990s traveling with his wife and family to at least three or four games a year.

Hayden was commissioned through Duquesne University's Air Force Reserve Officers' Training Corps program. Hayden entered active military service in 1969.

In 2020, he endorsed Joe Biden in the presidential election.

Personal life
Hayden is married to the former Jeanine Carrier. They have a daughter Margaret and two sons, Michael and Liam.

Health
In November 2018, Hayden was hospitalized after suffering a stroke; he suffers from aphasia as a result.

Intelligence career
Hayden has served as commander of the Air Intelligence Agency and director of the Joint Command and Control Warfare Center, both headquartered at Lackland Air Force Base. He also has served in senior staff positions in the Pentagon; Headquarters U.S. European Command, Stuttgart, Germany; the National Security Council, Washington, D.C., and the U.S. Embassy in the then-People's Republic of Bulgaria. Prior to becoming Director of the National Security Agency, the general served as deputy chief of staff for United Nations Command and U.S. Forces Korea, Yongsan Garrison. He has also worked in intelligence in Guam.

Air Intelligence Agency
From 1996 to 1997, Hayden served as commander of the AIA, an agency of 16,000 charged with defending and exploiting the "information domain."

National Security Agency
Hayden served as the director of the National Security Agency and chief of the Central Security Service at Fort George G. Meade, Maryland, from March 1999 to April 2005. As the director of NSA and chief of CSS, he was responsible for a combat support agency of the Department of Defense with military and civilian personnel stationed worldwide.

Strategy for the NSA
Hayden came to the NSA at a time of great trouble in the agency. Internal government analysis indicated it suffered from a lack of quality management and an outdated IT infrastructure. In fact soon after he came on board, a huge part of the NSA network system crashed and was down for several days. Part of his plan to revitalize the agency was to introduce more outside contractors, induce a lot of old managers to retire and get rid of old management structures. Part of his plan also included increased openness at the agency; it had historically been one of the most secretive organs of government. He notably allowed James Bamford access for his book Body of Secrets. Hayden was also initially extremely concerned with following the laws against domestic surveillance. Many reports say that after 9/11, he became more concerned with stopping terrorism, and allegedly softened his stance against domestic surveillance. Hayden however has said that he believed everything the agency was doing was "effective, appropriate, and lawful".

On 9/11, Hayden immediately evacuated all non-essential personnel from NSA headquarters. After 9/11, the agency greatly increased its activity. Details about its operations have been largely hidden, but it played a major role in the wars in Afghanistan and Iraq and the War on Terror. One notable example is its relationship with the unmanned aerial vehicle 'drone' program.

Wiretaps of domestic communication
In May 2006, USA Today reported that, under Hayden's leadership, the NSA created a domestic telephone call database. During his nomination hearings, Hayden defended his actions to Senator Russ Feingold and others, stating that he had relied upon legal advice from the White House that building the database was supported by Article Two of the United States Constitution executive branch powers (in which the president must "take care that the laws be faithfully executed"), overriding legislative branch statutes forbidding warrantless surveillance of domestic calls, which included the Foreign Intelligence Surveillance Act (FISA). Previously, this action would have required a warrant from a FISA court. The stated purpose of the database was to eavesdrop on international communications between persons within the U.S. and individuals and groups overseas in order to locate terrorists.

Trailblazer
Hayden also championed the Trailblazer Project, a "transformation" effort to better apply information technology. However, whatever the potential merits of the project, it was even criticized internally, by several NSA staffers, for failing to include privacy protections for United States citizens -- a potential substantive failure and again opening the agency up to a recurring drumbeat of external critical feedback and even attacks, yet and at the same time, also for perhaps resulting as a wasteful or even pernicious waste of money, in some ways. The critics included Diane S Roark, of the House Intelligence Committee, NSA workers Thomas Andrews Drake, William Binney, J. Kirk Wiebe, and Loomis, and others. Hayden severely rebuked these critics. Several quit in protest. After investigations by the NSA inspector general, the DOD inspector general, and Congress, Trailblazer was shut down.

Principal Deputy Director of National Intelligence

As part of the Intelligence Reform and Terrorism Prevention Act of 2004, the CIA chief no longer would run the intelligence community. Instead a new office was created for this purpose; the Director of National Intelligence. General Hayden became the Principal Deputy Director of National Intelligence from May 2005 to May 2006 under the first DNI, John Negroponte.

Civil liberties
On January 23, 2006, Hayden participated in a news conference. A YouTube video was posted of Michael Hayden telling reporters at a press conference that "probable cause" is not required for all searches or seizures under the Fourth Amendment, claiming instead that the standard is whether the search or seizure is reasonable. "Probable cause" is required for all warrants, whether or not the search or seizure is deemed to be "unreasonable."

Many critics of enhanced interrogation techniques maintain that they were torture and did not yield reliable information from CIA detainees.  Hayden said such views, or the notion that enhanced interrogation never yielded useful intelligence, is not credible and the product of "interrogation deniers".

Director of the Central Intelligence Agency

On May 8, 2006, Hayden was nominated by President George W. Bush to be Director of the Central Intelligence Agency after the resignation of Porter J. Goss on May 5, 2006. He was later confirmed on May 26, 2006, as director, 78–15, by full U.S. Senate vote.

Critics of the nomination and Hayden's attempts to increase domestic surveillance included Senator Dianne Feinstein who stated on May 11, 2006, that "I happen to believe we are on our way to a major constitutional confrontation on Fourth Amendment guarantees of unreasonable search and seizure".

Hayden has been accused of lying to Congress during his 2007 testimony about the CIA's 'enhanced interrogation program.

In 2007, Hayden lobbied to allow the CIA to conduct drone strikes purely on the behavior of ground vehicles, with no further evidence of connection to terrorism.

In 2008 Hayden warned of the destabilizing consequences of Muslim migration to Europe that might raise the possibility of civil unrest. According to Leon Panetta's memoir, Worthy Fights, Hayden had hoped to be retained as CIA director by the Obama administration and derisively referred to his successor as "Rahm Emanuel's goombah". In conversations with Panetta, Hayden encouraged him to advise the president to protect the CIA's right to engage in enhanced interrogation techniques as well as to avoid suggesting that CIA officers had ever performed torture.

In 2013, after the P5+1 reached a nuclear agreement with Iran, Hayden said, "We have accepted Iranian uranium enrichment."

The 2014 Senate Intelligence Committee report on CIA torture cited an email prepared by a subordinate that indicated that as CIA Director, Hayden instructed that out-of-date information be used in briefing Congress so that fewer than 100 Guantanamo Bay detainees would be reported.

NSA spying scandal

During his tenure as director, he oversaw the controversial NSA surveillance of technological communications between persons in the United States and alleged foreign terrorist groups. Numerous commentators have accused Hayden of lying to congress, and breaking the law. According ThinkProgress, Hayden misled Congress in a 2002 testimony, where he testified that any surveillance of persons in the United States was consistent with the Foreign Intelligence Surveillance Act. ThinkProgress stated that "at the time of his statements, Hayden was fully aware of the presidential order to conduct warrantless domestic spying issued the previous year. But Hayden didn’t feel as though he needed to share that with Congress. Apparently, Hayden believed that he had been legally authorized to conduct the surveillance, but told Congress that he had no authority to do exactly what he was doing. The Fraud and False Statements statute (18 U.S.C. 1001) make Hayden’s misleading statements to Congress illegal." Trevor Timm, executive director of Freedom of the Press Foundation, also accused the NSA program set up during Hayden's tenure of violating the Foreign Intelligence Surveillance Act.

In September 2013, Hayden stressed the indisputable legality of "what the NSA is doing" and called Edward Snowden a "troubled young man" and "morally arrogant to a tremendous degree"; he also said about his prospects in Russia: "I suspect he will end up like most of the rest of the defectors who went to the old Soviet Union: Isolated, bored, lonely, depressed—and most of them ended up alcoholics."

In 2020, a federal court ruled that the NSA program of mass surveillance of Americans’ telephone records was illegal and possibly unconstitutional.

Military career

Awards and decorations

Effective dates of promotion

Honors
In 2007, Hayden received the Golden Plate Award of the American Academy of Achievement. In 2008, in his native Northside neighborhood, the city of Pittsburgh named a part of a street going past
Heinz Field in his honor. On July 26, 2011, Hayden was inducted into the Air Force Reserve Officer Training Corps Distinguished Alumni in a ceremony at Maxwell AFB, Alabama, officiated by Lt. Gen. Allen G. Peck, commander, Air University. He serves as a member of the board of advisors of the Military Cyber Professionals Association (MCPA)

Bibliography

Books

Critical studies and reviews of Hayden's work
 

Playing to the Edge was one of The New York Times Book Reviews 100 Most Notable Books of 2016.

References

External links

 Official Air Force biography
 Official CIA biography
 Official NSA biography
 
 C-SPAN Q&A interview with Hayden, April 15, 2007
 
 

|-

|-

1945 births
American people of Irish descent
Commanders Crosses of the Order of Merit of the Federal Republic of Germany
Directors of the Central Intelligence Agency
Directors of the National Security Agency
Duquesne University alumni
George W. Bush administration personnel
Honorary Officers of the Order of Australia
Living people
Order of National Security Merit members
Recipients of the Defense Distinguished Service Medal
Recipients of the Defense Superior Service Medal
Recipients of the Legion of Merit
United States Air Force generals
United States Deputy Directors of National Intelligence
The Washington Institute for Near East Policy